Tai Lam Tunnel Bus Interchange is a major bus interchange near Kam Tin, Hong Kong. It is at the northern exit of Tai Lam Tunnel, near Kam Sheung Road station.

Bus stations in Hong Kong
Kam Tin
Transport interchange in Hong Kong